Chaudhry Ashraf Ali Ansari is a Pakistani politician who had been a Member of the Provincial Assembly of the Punjab from August 2018 till January 2023. Previously, he was a Member of the Provincial Assembly of the Punjab, from May 2013 to May 2018.

Early life and education
He was born on 15 September 1969 in Sheikhupura.

He has a degree of Bachelor of Science which he obtained in 1992 from University of the Punjab.

Political career
He was elected to the Provincial Assembly of the Punjab as a candidate of Pakistan Muslim League (Nawaz) (PML-N) from Constituency PP-93 (Gujranwala-III) in 2013 Pakistani general election.

He was re-elected to Provincial Assembly of the Punjab as a candidate of PML-N from Constituency PP-57 (Gujranwala-VII) in 2018 Pakistani general election.

References

Living people
Punjab MPAs 2013–2018
1969 births
Pakistan Muslim League (N) MPAs (Punjab)
Punjab MPAs 2018–2023